The Huanghai Major (小柴神) is a compact pickup truck manufactured in the China by the Chinese automobile manufacturer SG Automotive since 2007.

Overview

The Huanghai Major is available with two engines including the 2.2 liter four-cylinder petrol engine producing 103 hp and 193 nm of torque, and a 2.4 liter four-cylinder turbo diesel engine producing 88 hp and a torque of 225 nm, both mated to a 5-speed manual gearbox. Prices of the Huanghai Major ranges from 54,800 yuan to 62,800 yuan. 

Styling of the Huanghai Major has been controversial as the exterior design is heavily resembling the second generation Toyota Tacoma.

References

External links
 Huanghai website

2000s cars
Pickup trucks
Cars introduced in 2007
Trucks of China
Rear-wheel-drive vehicles
All-wheel-drive vehicles